Mark Ostendarp (born 24 January 1973 in Coesfeld, North Rhine-Westphalia) is a retired German runner, who specialized in the 3000 metres steeplechase.

Ostendarp won the 1997 Summer Universiade, finished ninth at the 1997 World Championships and at the 1998 European Championships. At the 1998 IAAF World Cup he ran the 1500 metres and finished sixth.

He became German steeplechase champion in 1997, representing the team TV Wattenscheid.

His time of 8:18.49 minutes from the 1997 World Championships in Athens remained his career best time. This result places him ninth on the German all-time performers list, behind Damian Kallabis, Hagen Melzer, Frank Baumgartl, Rainer Schwarz, Uwe Pflügner, Michael Karst, Steffen Brand and Patriz Ilg.

References

1973 births
Living people
People from Coesfeld
Sportspeople from Münster (region)
German male long-distance runners
German male steeplechase runners
Universiade medalists in athletics (track and field)
Universiade gold medalists for Germany
Medalists at the 1997 Summer Universiade
21st-century German people
20th-century German people